Tradimento is a 1982 musical comedy film by Alfonso Brescia featuring Mario Merola, Antonio Allocca, and Nino D'Angelo set in Naples. The soundtrack contains several Neapolitan songs.

Soundtrack
Acquarello napoletano (Benedetto - Bonagura) sung by Mario Merola
Ndringhete ndrà (Cinquegrana - De Gregorio) sung by Mario Merola
Tradimento (music Eduardo Alfieri - lyrics Salvatore Palomba) sung by Mario Merola
Ballammo (V. Annona - De Paolis - D'Angelo)  sung by Nino D'Angelo
Che si pè me (R. Fiore - De Paolis - D'Angelo)  sung by Nino D'Angelo

References

1982 films
1980s Italian films